Albert Costa was the defending champion, but lost in the semifinals to Mariano Puerta.

Àlex Corretja won the title, defeating Puerta in the final 6–1, 6–3.

Seeds
A champion seed is indicated in bold while text in italics indicates the round in which that seed was eliminated.

Draw

Finals

Top half

Bottom half

References
 Main Draw

Swiss Open (tennis)
2000 ATP Tour